Koirala family (Nepali: कोईराला परिवार) is one of the prominent political families of Nepal in the Republican Era. The family was founded by Krishna Prasad Koirala, a Rana Era socio-political activist who was exiled to Bihar, India by then Prime Minister Maharaja Chandra Sumsher. Many of the family members have remained prominent figures in the Nepali Congress party since the country's first democratic movement. Four members, three of them brothers (Matrika Prasad Koirala, B. P. Koirala and Girija Prasad Koirala) and their maternal cousin Sushil Koirala, have been Prime Minister of Nepal. Some members who do not have political aspirations have gone on to become prominent members in Nepali society making substantial personal contributions in the professions, the arts, academia, and the media as Bollywood actress Manisha Koirala.

Koirala family were original inhabitants of Dumja village, Sindhuli district belonging to the Hill-Brahmin caste.

Family members
Father: Krishna Prasad Koirala

Sons:

 Matrika Prasad Koirala (1912–1997) ex-prime minister 
 Bishweshwar Prasad Koirala (1914–1982) ex-prime minister
 Keshav Prasad Koirala (1922–1974)
 Tarini Prasad Koirala (1923–1973) journalist, writer
 Girija Prasad Koirala (1925–2010) ex-prime minister

Daughters: 
 Sauri Koirala (Arjel) 
 Nalini Koirala (Upadhaya)
 Indira Koirala (Acharya)
 Vijaya Laxmi Koirala (Zaki)

Family of Matrika Prasad Koirala
Wife: Manju Koirala

Sons:
 Bimal Koirala, deceased (wife: Sharada (Binita) Koirala), Sons: Bikash Koirala (wife: Ranjeeta Aryal Koirala), Ashish Koirala (wife: Poonam Bhattarai Koirala)
 Kamal Koirala, journalist, diplomat (previous Ambassador to South Korea), politician with CPN(UML) (wife: Dhana Koirala), children: Dr. Kanchan Koirala (wife: Dr. Regina Koirala), Richa Koirala (husband: Anil Adhikari, daughter:Ananya Koirala)
 Ajay Koirala (deceased), Son: Amit Koirala (wife: Srijana Prasai Koirala) Amit Koirala, Son: Atreya Koirala.
 Bijay Koirala (wife: Anita Koirala)  children: Anshu Koirala (wife: Kirti Koirala), Anisha Koirala Sapkota (husband: Deepak Sapkota)
 Sanjay Koirala, deceased (wife: Pushpa Acharya), son: Dipanker Acharya-Koirala
Hari Koirala

Daughters: 
 Sabita Koirala (Arjyal) (deceased) (husband: Dhruba Prasad Arjyal) (deceased), Children: Smita Ghimire (Husband: Navin Ghimire), Sameer Arjyal (Wife: Subikshya Arjyal), Shirish Arjyal (Wife: Kalpana Arjyal), Sweta Subedi (Husband: Subarna Bhusan Subedi)
 Kabita Koirala ( Acharya) ( deceased) (husband: Madhav Acharya), Children: Anand Raj Acharya

Family of Bishweshwar Prasad Koirala 

Wife: Sushila Koirala

Sons: 
 Prakash Koirala, (married to Sushma Koirala)
Siddharth Koirala, Grandson 
Manisha Koirala, Granddaughter, Ex-Husband: Samrat Dahal (divorced)
 Dr. Shree Harsh Koirala, Engineer (married to Ruchira Koirala, from Mumbai) 
 Shreyas Koirala, Grandson
 Avanti Koirala, Granddaughter
 Dr. Shashanka Koirala, Eye Specialist, Leader of Nepali Congress (married to Suphatra Koirala) 
 Supriya Koirala, Granddaughter

Daughter:
 Chetana Koirala

Family of Keshav Prasad Koirala
Wife: Nona Koirala

Sons: 
 Niranjan Koirala (Wife: Santosh Koirala, deceased, Ila Dalmia Koirala, deceased)
 Dr. Shekhar Koirala (Wife: Poonam Koirala), Nepali Congress-CWC Member, current Member of the Constituent Assembly, former Vice Chancellor of B.P. Koirala Institute of Health Sciences, Nepal
 Neha Koirala, Daughter

Family of Tarini Prasad Koirala

Wife: Rosa Koirala

Son: 
 Jyoti Koirala, Engineer, NC General Convention (Maha Samiti) Member, Wife: Indira Koirala, NC General Convention (Maha Samiti) Member, Dr. Megha Koirala, Pooja Koirala

Daughter: 
 Kalpana Koirala, deceased, husband: Laxman Basnet, president of Nepal Trade Union Congress (NTUC) Daughters: Aparna Basnet (Granddaughter Adya Basnet), Prasanna Basnet, (Son in law Siddharth Mani Rajbhandari and Granddaughter Vasavi Prasanna Rajbhandari), Priyanka Basnet, (Son in Law Ninesh Tiwari).

Family of Girija Prasad Koirala 
Wife: Sushma koirala

Daughter:
 Sujata Koirala, Deputy Prime Minister

Family of Sauri Koirala (Arjel) 
Son: 
Uday Arjel - Deceased

Son: Dr. Russ Raj Arjal
Grandchildren: Reed Kathleen Arjal, Henry Raj Arjal, Soren Rose Arjal

Daughter: 
1. Nirja Khanal, Husband: Sri niwas khanal, Sons: Nirmesh Khanal, Rajesh Khanal, daughter in law: Bipnita khanal,Grandchildren :Aahana khanal and aryan khanal 

Daughter: 2. Neelam Arjel Sharma
   Husband: Iswari Chandra Sharma 
   Daughters:
   A. Nabina Sharma
      Son: Abhinav Bhandari
   B. Nameeta Sharma Dhital
      Husband: Bhagwat Dhital
   C. Dr. Niharika Sharma Parajuli
      Husband: Dr. Parakram Parajuli
      Son: Prabuddha Parajuli

4. Daughter: Nupur Khanal
  Husband: Deepak Kumar Khanal
  Son: Aditya Kumar Khanal
  Wife: Aishwarya Gautam Khanal

Famous people in Koirala family 
Saradha Koirala, poet and writer, New Zealand, Australia
Tarini Prasad Koirala (1923–1973), Nepalese politician, journalist and writer
Raj Ballav Koirala (born 1982), Nepalese actor
Bharat Koirala, winner of the 2002 Ramon Magsaysay Award for Journalism
Manisha Koirala, renowned Nepalese actress predominantly working in Indian Films. She is the daughter of Prakash Koirala and granddaughter of Bishweshwar Prasad Koirala. She received Nepal's 2nd highest honor the Order of Gorkha Dakshina Bahu, by the Government of Nepal

Gallery

Notes

References

 
Bahun
Nepalese families
Political families of Nepal